The Soul That Brays (French: Âme qui brait, Arabic: نهيق الروح) is 1984 Moroccan film directed by Nabyl Lahlou.

Synopsis 
Through the tragic fate of a former resistance fighter, a donkey narrates the story of the citizens who participated in the struggle against the authorities of the French protectorate during the exile of King Mohammed V, and of the traitors who collaborated with the colonizers to become rich.

Cast 

 Sophia Hadi
 Ahmed Bourachid
 Nabyl Lahlou
 Ahmed Yazami

References 

1984 films
Moroccan drama films
1980s Arabic-language films
Films directed by Nabyl Lahlou